Young Ittefaq is a Pakistani football club based in Chaman, Balochistan, Pakistan.

History 
Young Ittefaq made its debut in the 2014-15 PFF League against Baloch Nushki. They lost their debut 2-0 and were eliminated from the tournament. In the 2020-21 PFF League, it was in the club leg along with Jeay Laal, Wohaib, Baloch Nushki and Lyallpur. Due to the matches being postponed, they will play from the announced dates from Pakistan Football Federation.

References 

Football clubs in Pakistan
Football in Chaman
Association football clubs established in 2014
2014 establishments in Pakistan